Brad Stewart Lancaster (born 1967) is an expert in the field of rainwater harvesting and water management. He is also a permaculture teacher, designer, consultant and co-founder of Desert Harvesters, a non-profit organization.

Lancaster helped legalize the harvest of street runoff in the city of Tucson, Arizona, with then-illegal water-harvesting curb cuts at his and his brother’s home and demonstration site that made openings in the street curb to enable street runoff to freely irrigate street-side and in-street water-harvesting/traffic-calming landscapes of food-bearing native vegetation. After proving the concept, Brad then worked with the City of Tucson to legalize, enhance, and incentivize the process.

Lancaster co-created and now co-organizes the Neighborhood Foresters program which since 1996 has coordinated volunteer crews of neighbors to plant and steward over 1,500 native food-bearing trees and hundreds of native food-bearing understory plantings within or beside water-harvesting earthworks in his neighborhood, while helping and training volunteers from other neighborhoods to lead similar efforts in their neighborhoods.

The Desert Harvesters non-profit organization Brad co-founded teaches the public how to identify, harvest, and process many of the native-plant foods neighbors are planting in their neighborhoods. Desert Harvesters also makes the utilization of native foods easier by organizing community milling events that mill native mesquite pods into nutritious and delicious mesquite flour which is utilized by a growing number of restaurants, breweries, and home kitchens.

A 2009 project involved acting as a representative for the U.S. State Department on an educational tour in the Middle East.

Lectures
Lancaster lectures at the ECOSA Institute; the University of Arizona; and Prescott College. He has been a guest speaker at the annual Bioneers Convergence; Green Festival USGBC’s Greenbuild Conference; Texas Natural Building Colloquium; the New Mexico Xeriscape Conference; the Green Festival; the 2009 Water Conservation & Xeriscaping EXPO; the New Mexico Organic Farming Conference; and various Audubon Expeditions.

Design
Lancaster has designed integrated water-harvesting and permaculture systems for multiple projects, including the Tucson Audubon Simpson Farm restoration site, the Milagro development, Stone Curves co-housing project, and the Tucson Nature Conservancy water-harvesting demonstration site.

Books
 Lancaster, Brad (2020). Rainwater Harvesting for Drylands and Beyond, Volume 2: Water-Harvesting Earthworks, 2nd Edition. Rainsource Press.
 Lancaster, Brad (2019). Rainwater Harvesting for Drylands and Beyond, Volume 1: Guiding Principles to Welcome Rain into Your Life and Landscape, 3rd Edition. Rainsource Press.
 Desert Harvesters (2018). Eat Mesquite and More: A Cookbook for Sonoran Desert Foods and Living. Rainsource Press. [Brad Lancaster: contributing author and editor.]
 Lancaster, Brad (2013). Rainwater Harvesting for Drylands and Beyond, Volume 1: Guiding Principles to Welcome Rain into Your Life and Landscape, 2nd Edition. Rainsource Press.
 Lancaster, Brad (2008). Rainwater Harvesting for Drylands and Beyond, Volume 2: Water-Harvesting Earthworks, 1st Edition. Rainsource Press.
 Lancaster, Brad (2006). Rainwater Harvesting for Drylands and Beyond, Volume 1: Guiding Principles to Welcome Rain into Your Life and Landscape, 1st Edition. Rainsource Press.

Published articles
Journal of American Water Works Association
The Ecologist
Chelsea Green

Awards 
MOCA Local Genius Award: Tucson (2016)
Lifetime Achievement Award: American Rainwater Catchment Systems Association (ARCSA) (2015)
Bicycle Commuter of the Year: Tucson-Pima County Bicycle Advisory Committee (2014)
Cox Conserves Hero: Arizona (2013)
David Yetman Award: Tucson Audubon Society (2013)
Award of Excellence/Personal Recognition from American Rainwater Catchment Systems Association (2008) 
Arizona Department of Water Resources/Tohono Chul Park Xeriscape Contest Award, First Place – Homeowner under $10,000 (2005)
Arizona Department of Water Resources/Tohono Chul Park Xeriscape Contest Award – Best Water Harvesting (2005)
Arizona Department of Water Resources/Tohono Chul Park Xeriscape Contest Award –J.D. Di Melglio Artistry in Landscaping (2005)
City of Tucson and Pima County Good Neighbor Award (2001)
Tucson Weekly voted Dunbar/Spring Organic Community Garden the Best Neighborhood Garden (2000)

External links 
HarvestingRainwater.com
DesertHarvesters.org
Dryland-harvesting home gathers sun, rain, food

Interviews
Eat Mesquite and More! with Brad Lancaster and Jill Lorenzini, The Permaculture Podcast, 10 March 2018
The Desert Harvesters with Brad Lancaster, The Permaculture Podcast, 3 December 2015
Water Harvesting with Brad Lancaster, The Permaculture Podcast, 15 January 2015
Tucson Man Harvests Water, National Public Radio (NPR), 10 September 2008
Harvesting Rainwater by Not Letting It Go to Waste, National Public Radio (NPR), 10 January 2008
 Brad Lancaster: Dancing in the Rain, New Dimensions Media, 30 October 2006
 Grow With the Flow: Legal Uses of Graywater, Carol Steinfeld, Natural Home and Garden, March/April 2008

References

1967 births
Living people
People involved with desert greening
Permaculturalists
People from Tucson, Arizona